Hunter Creek is an unincorporated community in Curry County, Oregon, United States. It lies on the east side of U.S. Route 101 south of Gold Beach along the Pacific coast. Hunter Creek, a stream with the same name, flows by the community before entering the Pacific Ocean slightly west of Route 101.

References

Oregon Coast
Populated coastal places in Oregon
Unincorporated communities in Curry County, Oregon
Unincorporated communities in Oregon